Apethorpe Palace (pronounced Ap-thorp, formerly known as "Apethorpe Hall", "Apethorpe House", "Apthorp Park" or "Apthorp Palace" ) in the parish of Apethorpe, Northamptonshire, England, is a Grade I listed country house dating back to the 15th century and was a "favourite royal residence for James I".  The main house is built around three courtyards lying on an east–west axis and is approximately 80,000 square feet in area. It is acknowledged as the finest example of a Jacobean stately home and one of Britain's ten best palaces. The building's successive alterations are attributed to three major architects: John Thorpe (1565-1655) for the Jacobean royal extension, Roger Morris (1695-1749) for the Neo-Palladian modifications, and Sir Reginald Blomfield (1856-1942) for the formal gardens and the Neo-Jacobean embellishments. The Lebanese cedar planted in 1614 is a scheduled monument considered to be the oldest surviving one in England.

Apethorpe holds a particularly important place in English history because of its ownership by, and role in entertaining, Tudor and Stuart monarchs. Elizabeth I inherited the estate from her father Henry VIII. Her successor James I personally contributed to its extension resulting in a set of impressive state rooms featuring some of the most important surviving plasterwork and fireplaces of the period. There were at least thirteen extended royal visits from the Stuart kings – more than to any other house in the country – between 1603 and 1636, and it was at Apethorpe that King James met his favourite and speculated lover, George Villiers, later to become Duke of Buckingham. A series of court masques written by Ben Jonson for James I were performed while the King was in residence at Apethorpe. The house was also lived in regularly by Charles I.

In 1622 King James financed an enlargement of the house and rebuilding of the south range with a new suite of state rooms on the first floor, and an open gallery around the perimeter of the house on the second floor. This suite of state rooms consisted of the Dining Chamber, the Drawing Chamber, the King Bedchamber, the Prince of Wales Bedchamber (with the three feathers carved on the fireplace) and the Long Gallery (last complete set of original Jacobean State apartments left in England). The entrance is still now surmounted by a statue of James I dating from that period. The King Bedchamber was embellished with a hunting scene over the fireplace and the royal arms decorated the ceiling. These State rooms contain a notable series of fireplaces incorporating in the carving iconographical statements such as the nature of kingship.

History

Early history

In May 1231 Henry III granted the manor of Apethorpe to Ralph le Breton; however on 21 June 1232 the manor was taken back into the king's hands. In the 15th century the manor was owned by Sir Guy Wolston. In 1515 Apethorpe was purchased by Henry Keble, grandfather of Lord Mountjoy, who sold the manor to Henry VIII.

Apethorpe was left to Princess Elizabeth in her father's Henry VIII's will. In April 1551 Sir Walter Mildmay acquired it from Edward VI in exchange for property in Gloucestershire and Berkshire. Queen Elizabeth dined with Mildmay at Apethorpe on her progress in 1562, 1566 and 1587. He added a stone chimney-piece with her words engraved dated 1562, and after his death it was inherited by his eldest son Sir Anthony Mildmay (c. 1549–1617), from whom Apethorpe passed to his daughter Mary (1581/2–1640) and her husband, Sir Francis Fane (1617), later Earl of Westmorland. Apethorpe remained in the Fane family for nearly three centuries.

Modern history

The 12th Earl and his son, the 13th Earl, came into financial difficulties and, in 1904, the family seat was sold to Henry Brassey. After World War II much of the adjoining estate was sold and the house became an approved school under the Catholic Church. In 1982 the school closed and in 1983 the building was sold to Wanis Mohamed Burweila, who wanted to found a university in the cloisters and courtyards of Apethorpe. His plans never materialised and he left the country for political reasons. As the house was empty, when English Heritage started its Buildings at Risk Register in 1998, the house was included on it as one of the most important houses at risk.

In September 2004 the entire estate was compulsorily purchased by the British Government under section 47 of the Planning (Listed Buildings and Conservation Areas) Act 1990 (only the second time the government has had to use these powers). English Heritage has spent £8 million refurbishing it to make it waterproof. Much of the work was carried out by Stamford restoration and conservation builders, E. Bowman & Sons Ltd. From 2007, buyers were sought, in spite of an estimated £6 million still required in renovation (as of 2014, the house was without any plumbing, power or heating). In 2008, the asking price was upwards of £4.5 million.

In December 2014, English Heritage announced that Baron von Pfetten, a French anglophile and keen field sportsman, had bought the property. Simon Thurley, English Heritage's chief executive, welcomed the purchase: "Since 2000 English Heritage has consistently said that the best solution for Apethorpe is for it to be taken on by a single owner, who wants to continue to restore the house and to live in it; especially one who has experience of restoring historic buildings and is prepared to share its joys with a wide public, as Baron Pfetten will do. Apethorpe is certainly on a par with Hatfield and Knole and is by far the most important country house to have been threatened with major loss through decay since the 1950s." Baron Pfetten has agreed to an 80-year commitment of 50 days public opening a year, a far more extensive undertaking than the normal period of 10 years in the case of English Heritage grant-aided properties.

Before the sale English Heritage and the new owner agreed to rename the house "Apethorpe Palace" due to its royal ownership and use, along with its outstanding historic and architectural significance.  In a video introducing the sale, English Heritage director Simon Thurley described the house as "the Royal Palace of Apethorpe." Since April 2015, the house is officially registered as Apethorpe Palace in the National Heritage List. The decision was met with some concern. Since 2015 the palace has been undergoing renovation works.

Film location
The house has been used for filming scenes in Another Country and Porterhouse Blue. The restoration and attempts to sell the property were the subject of a fly on the wall documentary first shown on BBC Two in April 2009.

References

References

External links

English Heritage Properties – Apethorpe Palace
English Heritage List Entry – Apethorpe Hall
BBC Video Tour of Apethorpe Hall
BBC documentary: English Heritage: A Very Grand Design (Apethorpe) 24 April 2009 (Adobe Flash)  

Grade I listed buildings in Northamptonshire
Grade I listed houses
Fane family
Country houses in Northamptonshire
Houses completed in the 15th century
Royal residences in England